The 1949 Wilkes 200 was a NASCAR Strictly Stock Series racing event that took place on October 16, 1949.

Ten thousand people would attend this live racing event where Kenneth Wagner qualified for the race with a pole position speed of  – the equivalent of 31.27 seconds. Weather conditions for the race were recorded at nearby Hickory Regional Airport; a public airport located three miles (5 km) west of the central business district of nearby Hickory, North Carolina.

Summary
This would be the final race of the 1949 NASCAR season and would take place at North Wilkesboro Speedway in North Wilkesboro, North Carolina.

Bob Flock would defeat Lee Petty by an entire football field –  – to win NASCAR's first racing event with an established name. Flock would earn a mere $1,500 in prize winnings ($ when inflation is taken into effect). Frank Mundy would receive a last-place finish for only finishing 38 laps out of the mandated 200 laps. Bill Blair would lead the most laps in this race with 180 laps led out of 200.

Red Byron would go on to win NASCAR's first ever championship while Sara Christian would become one of its first female drivers. Byron almost became a cripple after being shot by an enemy fighter plane while serving as a tail gunner on a B-24 Liberator bomber during World War II. He spent two years in military hospitals rehabilitating his leg so that he could compete in NASCAR after the war ended.

Notable crew chiefs who actively participated in the race were Buddy Elliott, Julian Petty, Buddy Helms, Red Vogt, and Cliff Rainwater.

While Red Byron and Lee Petty were the better drivers of the 1949 NASCAR Cup Series season, Bill Blair was the most consistent driver along with Petty.

Timeline
Section reference:
 Start of race: Bill Blair starts off the race in the pole position
 Lap 38: Frank Mundy withdrew from the race for reasons unknown
 Lap 155: Red Byron withdrew from the race for reasons unknown, he was assumed not have been paid for participating in this event
 Lap 181: Bob Flock takes over the lead from Bill Blair
 Lap 188: Sara Christian ended the racing event 12 laps behind Herb Thomas
 Lap 191: Bill Blair had a terminal problem with his engine, forcing him out of the race
 Lap 196: Roy Hall may or may not have finished the race six laps behind Thomas, records of this race were not kept in the NASCAR archives
 Finish: Bob Flock was officially declared the winner of the event

Results

Race summary 
 Lead changes: 2
 Cautions: N/A
 Red flags: N/A
 Time of race: 1 hours, 52 minutes, and 16 seconds
 Average speed: 
 Margin of Victory: 100 yards

References

Wilkes 200
Wilkes 200
NASCAR races at North Wilkesboro Speedway
Wilkes 200
Wilkes 200